Asen Vaskov Vasilev (born 9 September 1977) is a Bulgarian politician, economist, and entrepreneur. He is the co-leader of We Continue the Change, a political movement he co-founded with Kiril Petkov.

Childhood and education 
Vasilev was born on September 9, 1977, in Haskovo, Bulgaria. He earned a degree in economics from Harvard University in 2000 and continued studies at Harvard Business School and Harvard Law School.

Professional career 
Vasilev is a co-founder and president of Everbeard, an airline ticket pricing company. It is partly funded by the Singapore National Research Fund and the first Skype investor.

Vasilev was the co-founder and director of the Centre for Economic Strategy and Competitiveness. He is a lecturer in the Program for Economic Growth and Development, a branch of Sofia University "St. Kliment Ohridski” and with the Centre for Strategy and Competitiveness of Harvard Business School.

From 1999 to 2004, Vasilev worked as a consultant for Monitor Group in the US, Canada, Europe, and South Africa. He managed marketing and strategic development projects for large international companies in the fields of telecommunications, energy, mining, insurance, and several major consumer goods manufacturers.

Political career 
In 2013 Vasilev was Minister of Economy, Energy and Tourism in the caretaker government of Marin Raykov. From 12 May to 16 September 2021, he was Minister of Finance in the caretaker government of Stefan Yanev.

On 19 September 2021, together with Kiril Petkov, Vasilev presented his new political project "We continue the change". He was the leader of the party list in Haskovo and Sofia 23 for the 2021 Bulgarian general election on 14 November. The party won the most seats in the new parliament and formed a coalition government on 13 December 2021.

Vasilev became Deputy Prime Minister and Minister of Finance in the short-lived Petkov government.

The Petkov government's mandate ended in late June 2022 because of Russian mischief, and on 1 July President Rumen Radev asked Vasilev to form a new government.

One week later as prescribed by the constitution Vasilev informed the president that his party only had the support of 117 members, falling four short of the majority. "Unfortunately, we failed to gather enough support to implement the politics that our...government would have wanted to push through. We could not get the support needed to rid Bulgaria of corruption and make the state work for the people, instead of channeling taxpayers’ money into a few select companies that can use it to corrupt the political class. We hope that in the next elections, the additional four deputies will be elected by the people."

Other activities 
 European Bank for Reconstruction and Development (EBRD), Ex-Officio Member of the Board of Governors (since 2021)

References 

1977 births
Living people
21st-century Bulgarian politicians
Harvard Business School alumni
People from Haskovo
Finance ministers of Bulgaria